The Honorary Title "Honoured Test Pilot of the USSR" was a state award of the Soviet Union established on August 14, 1958 by Decree of the Presidium of the Supreme Soviet № 2523-X to recognise courage and excellence of military and civilian test pilots in flight research and testing of aircraft.  Its statute was confirmed on August 22, 1988 by Decree of the Presidium of the Supreme Soviet № 9441-XI.  The title ceased to be awarded following the December 1991 dissolution of the Soviet Union.

Award Statute 
The honorary title "Honoured Test Pilot of the USSR" was awarded to military and civilian test-pilots 1st class of the aerospace and defense industry and the Soviet Armed Forces, for multiple years of creative work in the field of testing and research of new aviation technologies.

The Presidium of the Supreme Soviet of the USSR was the main conferring authority of the award based on recommendations from the Ministry of Defence of the USSR or from the Ministry of Aviation Industry of the USSR.

The "Honoured Military Test Pilot of the USSR" chest badge was worn on the right side of the chest and in the presence of other orders, placed above them.  If worn with honorary titles of the Russian Federation, the latter have precedence.

Award Description 
The chest badge "Honoured Test Pilot of the USSR" was a 27mm wide by 23mm high silver and nickel polygon with raised edges. At the top of the obverse, the relief inscription in three lines covered to the left "HONOURED TEST PILOT", in the center, the gilt tombac image of a jet plane climbing diagonally towards the right its nose and tail slightly protruding over the edges, at the bottom, the relief inscription "USSR" superimposed over a laurel branch.

The badge was secured to a standard Soviet square mount by a silver-plated ring through the suspension loop. The mount was covered by a silk moiré blue ribbon.  It was secured to clothing by a threaded stud and nut or by a pin attachment.

Notable Recipients (partial list)
 Yury Abramovich
 Sergei Anokhin
 Toktar Aubakirov
 Yuri Garnaev
 Vladimir Ilyushin
 Rafael Kaprelyan
 Vladimir Kokkinaki
 Anatoly Kvochur
 Nina Rusakova
 Rimantas Stankevičius
 Amet-khan Sultan
 Igor Volk

See also 
Orders, decorations, and medals of the Soviet Union
Badges and Decorations of the Soviet Union
Soviet Air Force

References

External links 
Legal Library of the Soviet Union

Military awards and decorations of the Soviet Union
Honorary titles of the Soviet Union
Civil awards and decorations of the Soviet Union
Awards established in 1958
Awards disestablished in 1991
1991 disestablishments in the Soviet Union
Soviet test pilots